Walking With may refer to:

 Walking With (album), an album by Kim Dong-ryool
 Walking with..., a series of TV shows produced by the BBC